"Chance" was the fourth single from Scottish rock band Big Country's debut album, The Crossing.

Chart positions

Credits
Music and lyrics: Stuart Adamson, Bruce Watson, Mark Brzezicki, Tony Butler
Production: Steve Lillywhite

References

External links
Big Country's official website

1983 singles
Big Country songs
Song recordings produced by Steve Lillywhite
Songs written by Stuart Adamson
Songs written by Mark Brzezicki
Songs written by Tony Butler (musician)
Songs written by Bruce Watson (guitarist)
Rock ballads
1983 songs
Mercury Records singles